"Arrow Through Me" is a song by the British–American rock band Wings, released on their 1979 album Back to the Egg.

Background
"Arrow Through Me", unlike most songs on Back to the Egg, is more pop-oriented than rock-oriented.

{{quote|"Arrow Through Me", harmonically it is almost like Duke Ellington could have written it.|Laurence Juber, Daytrippin'''}}Ultimate Classic Rock contributor Nick DeRiso compared the keyboard bass line to those of Stevie Wonder and also praised the "inventive undulating polyrhythm" played by drummer Steve Holley. DeRiso rated "Arrow Through Me" to be Wings' 8th greatest song.  Billboard described it as "a light and bouncy midtempo tune with sparse orchestration."  Cash Box called the song "a slightly quirky tune" and said that the instrumentation creates a "somber but light backing for the pleading vocals. Record World called it a "unique and throroghly refreshing McCartney effort" whose rhythm "struts while the keyboards ring and bold horn charts inject energy."

Personnel
Paul McCartney – vocals, synth-bass, electric piano, clavinet
Steve Holley – drums, Flexatone
Howie Casey – horns
Tony Dorsey – horns
Steve Howard – horns
Thaddeus Richard – horns

Release
It was the A-side of the second US single released from Back to the Egg and peaked at number 29. The B-side was "Old Siam, Sir", which was the A-side of the first UK single.

Other
The song was used with the opening credits of, and as a main melody line through, the 1980 movie Oh! Heavenly Dog, starring Chevy Chase, Jane Seymour and Benji. In 2010, neo-soul artist Erykah Badu sampled "Arrow Through Me" on an album track called "Gone Baby, Don't Be Long" on her CD New Amerykah Part Two (Return of the Ankh). It also appeared in the WKRP in Cincinnati episode "God Talks to Johnny" (1979).

In 2020, the song appeared in episode 2 (track 2) of Hulus TV series adaptation of Nick Hornbys novel High Fidelity'' starring Zoë Kravitz.

Chart history

Weekly charts

Year-end charts

References

External links
 

Paul McCartney songs
1979 singles
1970s ballads
Paul McCartney and Wings songs
Songs written by Paul McCartney
Columbia Records singles
Song recordings produced by Paul McCartney
Song recordings produced by Chris Thomas (record producer)
Music published by MPL Music Publishing
Pop ballads